Robert Iverson (17 October 1910 –  19 July 1953) was an English professional footballer best known for his time at Aston Villa. Iverson signed for Villa from Wolves. After his Villa career he retired and became reserve/youth-team coach at Villa Park. He was later first team coach and fourth team coach.

References
Iverson's Bio

1910 births
1953 deaths
Aston Villa F.C. players
Aston Villa F.C. non-playing staff
English footballers
Association football defenders
Lincoln City F.C. players
Wolverhampton Wanderers F.C. players
English Football League players